Polystepha is a genus of gall midges in the family Cecidomyiidae. There are more than 20 described species in Polystepha.

Species
These 24 species belong to the genus Polystepha:

 Polystepha aceris (Felt, 1907)
 Polystepha americana (Felt, 1908)
 Polystepha canadensis (Felt, 1908)
 Polystepha caryae (Felt, 1908)
 Polystepha connecta (Felt, 1908)
 Polystepha cornifolia (Felt, 1907)
 Polystepha globosa (Felt, 1909)
 Polystepha lapalmae Möhn, 1960
 Polystepha malpighii (Kieffer, 1909)
 Polystepha multifila (Felt, 1907)
 Polystepha pilulae (Beutenmuller, 1892)
 Polystepha podagrae (Felt, 1909)
 Polystepha pustulata (Felt, 1909)
 Polystepha pustuloides (Beutenmuller, 1907)
 Polystepha quercifolia (Felt, 1908)
 Polystepha quercus Kieffer, 1897
 Polystepha rhoina (Felt, 1907)
 Polystepha rossica Mamaeva, 1981
 Polystepha salvadorensis Möhn, 1960
 Polystepha serrata (Felt, 1908)
 Polystepha simpla (Felt, 1909)
 Polystepha sobrina (Felt, 1907)
 Polystepha symmetrica (Osten Sacken, 1862)
 Polystepha transversa (Felt, 1907)

References

Further reading

 
 
 
 
 
 

Cecidomyiinae
Articles created by Qbugbot
Cecidomyiidae genera

Taxa named by Jean-Jacques Kieffer
Insects described in 1897